Northfield is a town in Washington County, Vermont, United States. The town lies in a valley within the Green Mountains and has been home to Norwich University since 1866. It contains the village of Northfield, where over half of the population lives. The town's total population was 5,918 at the 2020 census.

History
Northfield was chartered in 1781, and incorporated in 1855. The community was named after Northfield, Massachusetts.

Geography

The geographic center of Vermont is located within the town, with markers on the university campus of the geographical and magnetic centers.

Demographics

As of the census of 2000, there were 5,791 people, 1,819 households, and 1,224 families residing in the town. The population density was 132.5 people per square mile (51.2/km2). There were 1,958 housing units at an average density of 44.8 per square mile (17.3/km2). The racial makeup of the town was 95.41% White, 1.02% Black or African American, 0.36% Native American, 1.33% Asian, 0.43% from other races, and 1.45% from two or more races. Hispanic or Latino of any race were 2.21% of the population.

There were 1,819 households, out of which 32.4% had children under the age of 18 living with them, 53.5% were couples living together and joined in either marriage or civil union, 10.0% had a female householder with no husband present, and 32.7% were non-families. Of all households 24.3% were made up of individuals, and 9.7% had someone living alone who was 65 years of age or older. The average household size was 2.46 and the average family size was 2.95.

In the town, the population was spread out, with 19.4% under the age of 18, 27.2% from 18 to 24, 22.8% from 25 to 44, 18.9% from 45 to 64, and 11.6% who were 65 years of age or older. The median age was 30 years. For every 100 females, there were 122.0 males. For every 100 females age 18 and over, there were 122.5 males.

The median income for a household in the town was $41,523, and the median income for a family was $51,818. Males had a median income of $32,168 versus $24,781 for females. The per capita income for the town was $15,592. About 3.2% of families and 6.7% of the population were below the poverty line, including 6.4% of those under age 18 and 6.2% of those age 65 or over.

Education
Norwich University enrolls undergraduate students, and has a large online graduate program.

Media
Published locally is the Northfield News & Transcript. It is a weekly newspaper and was established in 1878 by George Richmond.

Economy
The town's largest employer is Norwich University, followed by Cabot Hosiery Mills.

Infrastructure

Transportation

Bus

Northfield is served by Green Mountain Transit Agency's commuter route 93 between Montpelier and Northfield.

Roads
  Vermont Route 12 – Northfield to Montpelier. Northfield to Brookfield.
  Vermont Route 64 – Northfield to Williamstown.

Notable people 

 Ida A. T. Arms, missionary, educator, and temperance leader
 Henry M. Bates, Vermont State Treasurer
 Murdock A. Campbell, United States Army Major General and Adjutant General, Vermont National Guard
 John P. Connarn, Vermont House of Representatives, 1957–1965; Vermont Attorney General, 1965–1967; Judge, Vermont District Court, 1967–1985
 Beatrice Corliss, first woman mayor of Gloucester, Massachusetts and member of the Massachusetts House of Representatives
 Reginald M. Cram, United States Air Force Major General and Adjutant General of the Vermont National Guard
 Joseph H. Denny, Speaker of the Vermont House of Representatives and President pro tempore of the Vermont State Senate 
 Alonzo Jackman, Norwich University professor and Brigadier General of the Vermont Militia in the American Civil War 
 Hollis Latham, Wisconsin state legislator and farmer (born in Northfield)
 George Nichols, Secretary of State of Vermont and president of Norwich University
 Charles Paine, president of the Vermont Central Railroad and 15th governor of Vermont
 Charles Plumley, congressman from Vermont
 Frank Plumley, congressman from Vermont
Francis V. Randall, Union Army officer during the American Civil War
Susanne R. Young, Vermont Attorney General beginning in June 2022

See also
 Central Vermont Railway
 Central Vermont Railway Depot (Northfield, Vermont)
 Northfield Savings Bank

References

External links
 
 Town of Northfield official website
 

 
Towns in Vermont
Towns in Washington County, Vermont